Walter Henry Green CBE, (1878 – 13 April 1958) was a British Labour and Co-operative politician for Deptford, elected in 1935 and MP until 1945. He became a councillor in Deptford in 1909, its mayor 1920–1922, and in 1944 became the first freeman of the borough. Later he became a member of the Metropolitan Water Board 1946–1953, and was appointed the C.B.E. Order of the British Empire in 1949.

Mayor of Deptford
Between 1920–1922, he was Mayor of Deptford. As part of his duties, on 22 March 1921, he unveiled the First World War memorial.

Members of Parliament 1935–1945
Walter Green was elected Member of Parliament in the 1935 General Election, in which he gained the seat for Labour, with a majority of 6,892 (14.62%) over Conservative Prospective parliamentary candidate, Sir Malcolm Campbell, the then land and water speed record holder.

Royal Arsenal Co-operative Society chairman
Between 1935–1947, he was Political Secretary of the Royal Arsenal Co-operative Society, the only Co-operative Society to be affiliated to the Labour Party nationally.

Labour Party Chairman
Between 1941–42 he was chairman of the Labour Party.

Personal
He married Grace Edith Puddlefoot in 1904, and together had a son and a daughter.

References

1878 births
1958 deaths
Labour Co-operative MPs for English constituencies
UK MPs 1935–1945
Members of London County Council
Members of Deptford Metropolitan Borough Council
Mayors of places in Greater London
Chairs of the Labour Party (UK)